Cutervo is a town in northern Peru, capital of both Cutervo District and Cutervo Province in Cajamarca Region. As of 2020, Cutervo had a population of 51,272.

References

Populated places in the Cajamarca Region
Populated places established in 1560